This article lists rosters and transactions during the 2021 T1 League off-season and the 2021–22 T1 League season.

Front office movements

Head coaching changes

Off-season

In-season

General manager assigns

Off-season

Draft 

There were 58 players participated in the draft, and 17 players were chosen in 5 rounds.

Trades

Pre-Season Transactions

Mid-Season Transactions

See also 
 2021–22 Kaohsiung Aquas season
 2021–22 New Taipei CTBC DEA season
 2021–22 Taichung Wagor Suns season
 2021–22 Tainan TSG GhostHawks season
 2021–22 TaiwanBeer HeroBears season
 2021–22 Taoyuan Leopards season

References

External links 

2021–22
2021–22 T1 League season